August or Auguste Emil Braun (April 19, 1809, in Gotha, Germany – September 12, 1856, in Rome) was a German archaeologist.

Biography 
Braun initially studied archaeology and philosophy in Göttingen, then continued his education at the University of Munich and in Dresden. In 1833, he accepted Eduard Gerhard's invitation to Berlin, where he made the decision to devote his career to art history.

In the autumn of 1833, he accompanied Gerhard to Rome, where in a short amount of time, he became a librarian, and subsequently secretary to the German Archaeological Institute. At the institute, he established a galvano-plastic workshop, from which issued many reproductions of antique art objects and casts of modern works.

Works 
Il giudizio di Paride (Paris, 1838) – The Judgement of Paris.
Die Kunstvorstellungen des geflügelten Dionysios (Munich, 1839) - Artistic notions involving the winged Dionysus.
Tages und des Hercules und der Minerva heilige Hochzeit (Munich, 1839) - Day of Hercules and Minerva's sacred marriage.
Antike Marmorwerke (Leipzig, 1843) - Antique marble works.
Die Schale des Kodros (Berlin, 1843) - The shell of the Kodros.
Die Ficoronische Cyste (Leipzig, 1850) - The Ficoroni cista.
Griechische Götterlehre (two volumes, Gotha, 1850–54) - Greek mythology 
Die Vorschule der Kunstmythologie (Gotha, 1854; English trans. by Grant, 1856)
Die Ruinen und Museen Roms, (Braunschweig, 1853) - Ruins and museums of Rome; a guidebook.

Notes

References 

1809 births
1856 deaths
Archaeologists from Thuringia
People from Gotha (town)
University of Göttingen alumni
Ludwig Maximilian University of Munich alumni